NGC 157 is an intermediate spiral galaxy in the constellation of Cetus. The compiler of the New General Catalogue, John Louis Emil Dreyer noted that NGC 157 was "pretty bright, large, extended, between 2 considerably bright stars". It was discovered on December 13, 1783 by William Herschel.

References

External links
 

0157
Cetus (constellation)
17831213
Intermediate spiral galaxies